Toyota Motor Europe (TME) is a subsidiary of Toyota Motor Corporation responsible for company operations in Europe and Western Asia (Turkey, Russia, Israel, Kazakhstan, and the Caucasus). Its operations include research and development, manufacturing, sales, marketing, after-sales, and corporate functions. The company is headquartered in Brussels, Belgium, and began operating in 1963.

History 
TME began selling cars in Europe under an official distributor agreement in 1963.

TME oversees the wholesale sales and marketing of Toyota and Lexus vehicles, parts and accessories, and Toyota’s European manufacturing and engineering operations. Toyota, directly and indirectly, employs around 80,000 people in Europe and has invested over €7 billion since 1990. Toyota’s operations in Europe are supported by a network of 31 National Marketing and Sales Companies across 49 countries, a total of around 3,000 sales outlets, and nine manufacturing plants.

Previous CEOs include:

 Dr. Johan Van Zyl (from 2015 to 2021)
 Didier Leroy (from 2010 to 2015)
 Tadashi Arashima (from 2005 to 2010)
 Akira Imai (from 1999 to 2005)
 Tatsuo Takahashi (from 1994 to 1999)

Sales 

Toyota became the best-selling Japanese car manufacturer in Europe in 1998, overtaking Nissan.

Toyota Motor Europe sales peaked in 2007 at 1.23 million units and a 5.70% market share. TME topped this peak in 2021 with a market share of 5.84%.

Operations 
The TME Head Office is located in Brussels, Belgium, and houses key departments of Toyota and Lexus in Europe. It also acts as the control centre for all European operations, including the main locations of manufacturing & engineering and marketing & sales activities.

Supporting facilities
Established in 1987, the Toyota Technical Centre in Zaventem, Belgium, is home to Toyota Motor Europe’s Research & Development (R&D), Purchasing and Production Engineering activities. Early in 2006, Toyota inaugurated the expansion of its technical centre. In 2007 an additional 35,000 m² was added for the expanded European design and engineering department.

The Toyota Training Centre in Zaventem provides training to service instructors and engineers from all of Toyota’s European distributors.

Located in Derbyshire, the European Global Production Centre is a hub for teaching best practices and training production staff and supervisors from Europe.

Toyota's Accessory and Service Centre in Brussels houses after-sales, conversion, and accessories activities. Its functions include the overall coordination of Toyota’s aftersales service operations, investigation of technical matters in the field, car body and paint training, accessories development and planning, as well as vehicle conversion.

Created in 2000 in Nice, France, Toyota Europe Design Development (ED2, stylized ED²) concentrates on design concepts for the European market, including advanced design, design competition, and production support for European models and design research information. It replaced the Zaventem-based Toyota European Office of Creation (EPOC), founded in 1989. Since 2016, the Toyota Design Centre of Zaventem re-opened to take the weight off ED² by helping it to develop production cars, such as the Toyota Aygo X.

Le Rendez- Vous Toyota in Paris is a venue for internal and public events.

Manufacturing centres
Toyota Motor Manufacturing Czech Republic – Kolín
Toyota Motor Manufacturing France – Onnaing
Toyota Motor Manufacturing Poland
Engine Plant – Jelcz-Laskowice
Engine & Transmission Plant – Wałbrzych
Toyota Caetano Portugal – Ovar
Toyota Motor Manufacturing Russia –  Saint Petersburg (defunct 2022)
Toyota Motor Manufacturing Turkey – Arifiye
Toyota Manufacturing UK
Vehicle Assembly Plant – Burnaston
Engine Plant – Deeside

Toyota also operates a joint venture plant with Citroën and Peugeot in Valenciennes, France.

Other facilities
Toyota Gazoo Racing Europe - Cologne, Germany. Research, development and manufacturing for motor racing activities.

Environmental activities 
In 2008, Toyota began its European sustainable plant program at two manufacturing companies in France and the United Kingdom. The activities are supposed to emphasize the role of nature in creating production sites that are in harmony with their natural surroundings. TMMF (Valenciennes, France) and TMUK (Burnaston and Deeside, UK) will ramp up efforts in Europe by serving as the industry benchmark for sustainable production of vehicles and engines. Each plant will pilot activities to help realize 2010 environmental targets, including a 25% reduction in water use by Toyota’s European manufacturing network. Successful activities will be adopted as standards by Toyota plants globally.

Vehicles designed by Toyota ED² 
Production cars (partially or totally designed by Toyota Europe Design Development) :

 Lexus SC (2001),
 Toyota Yaris I (2001),
 Toyota Avensis II (2003),
 Toyota Corolla Verso II (2004),
 Toyota Yaris II (2005),
 Toyota Auris I (2006),
 Toyota Avensis III (2009),
 Lexus IS III (2013),
 Toyota Avensis III Restylée (2012),
 Toyota Verso Restylé (2013),
 Toyota Land Cruiser J150 Restylé (2013),
 Toyota Avensis III Restylée (2015),
 Toyota C-HR (2016),
 Toyota Yaris III Restylée (2017),
 Toyota Yaris IV (2020),
 Toyota Yaris Cross (2020),
 Toyota e-Palette (2020),
 Toyota bZ4X (2021).

Concept cars :

 Toyota CS&S (2003),
 Toyota Motor Triathlon Race Car (2004),
 Toyota Endo (2005),
 Toyota Urban Cruiser Concept (2006),
 Toyota Hybrid X (2007),
 Toyota IQ Concept (2007),
 Toyota FT-86 Concept (2009),
 Toyota FT-CH (2010),
 Toyota me.we (2013, with the Studio Massaud),
 Toyota C-HR Concept (2015),
 Lexus LF-SA (2015),
 Toyota i-TRIL (2017),
 Lexus UX Concept (2017),
 Toyota e-Care (2019),
 Toyota e-4me (2019),
 Toyota e-Trans (2019),
 Toyota e-Racer (2019),
 Lexus LF-30 (2019),
 Toyota Aygo X Prologue (2021),
 Toyota Compact Cruiser EV (2022),
 Toyota bZ Compact SUV (2022),
 Toyota C-HR Prologue (2022).

Other works :

 Skyjet and yacht for the movie Valérian and the City of a Thousand Planets (2017),
 Toyota e-Chargeair (2019), autonomous H2 charging system,
 Lexus "Lunar Concepts" sketches for Document Journal art magazine : Lexus Zero Gravity, Lexus Cosmos, Lexus Bouncing Moon Roller, Lexus Lunar Cruiser, Lexus Lunar Mission, Lexus Moon Racer and Lexus Lunar (2020)

References

External links
 
Toyota Gazoo Racing Europe official site

Toyota
Companies based in Brussels
Vehicle manufacturing companies established in 1963
1963 establishments in Europe